WNKX-FM (96.7 FM, "Country KiX96") is a radio station broadcasting a country music format. Licensed to Centerville, Tennessee, United States, the station is currently owned by William Nunley, through licensee Hickman Digital Media, Inc.

References

External links
 
 

Country radio stations in the United States
NKX-FM
Hickman County, Tennessee